Tollesby is a residential area within the Middlesbrough ward of Ladgate in North Yorkshire, England. It is south-east of the Middlesbrough Municipal Golf Course.

The area was previously a separate hamlet near Marton-in-Cleveland before being absorbed with Middlesbrough, with its neighbour. The local schools are Easterside Academy, Holmwood and St Thomas More Primary.

Gallery

Villages in North Yorkshire
Areas within Middlesbrough